Seneca Township is located in McHenry County, Illinois. As of the 2020 census, its population was 2,893 and it contained 1,102 housing units.

Geography

Demographics

References

External links
Seneca Township official website
City-data.com
Illinois State Archives: McHenry County Fact Sheet

Townships in McHenry County, Illinois
Townships in Illinois